The Vitruvian scroll is a scroll pattern used in architectural moldings and borders in other media.  It is also known as the Vitruvian wave, wave scroll, or running dog pattern.  The pattern resembles waves in water or a series of parchment scrolls viewed on end.

"Vitruvian" refers to the Roman architect Marcus Vitruvius Pollio ("Vitruvius"), who wrote the oldest extant book on architecture, which describes some of the classical architectural orders.

See also
Meander (art)

References

External links 
 Buffalo, NY 

Architectural elements